Henri George Doll (13 August 1902 in Paris – 25 July 1991 in Montfort-l'Amaury, France) was a French-American scientist.

Biography
Doll was a leading figure in the development of oil well logging and a key technical leader of the Schlumberger oilfield services company. A graduate of the École Polytechnique and École des Mines, he married Anne Schlumberger, daughter of one of the Schlumberger brothers (Conrad), and joined their company.

His contributions include the induction logging technique, and during World War II he led the development of the jeep-borne mine detector. He received a Certificate of Appreciation from the United States government, and was made an officer of the Légion d'honneur.

Upon his retirement in 1967, the Schlumberger Well Surveying Corporation's research laboratory in Ridgefield, Connecticut was renamed the Schlumberger-Doll Research Center in his honor.  The Schlumberger-Doll Research Center was relocated to Cambridge, Massachusetts in 2006.Schlumberger-Doll Research Center, Schlumberger

Doll came to the United States in 1941 and became an American citizen in 1962. His marriage with Annette Schlumberger ended in divorce. His second wife was the ballerina Eugenia Delarova, who was once married to the choreographer Léonide Massine.

References
 Wayback Machine
 Search Results - Schlumberger Oilfield Glossary
 Obituary in New York Times

1902 births
1991 deaths
20th-century French geologists
Schlumberger people
Recipients of the Legion of Honour
Scientists from Paris
French emigrants to the United States